Johanna Elisabeth "Els" Coppens-van de Rijt (born  August 18, 1943) is an artist and author from Vlierden, Netherlands.

Coppens-van de Rijt was born in Sint-Oedenrode, as one of twins to a Roman Catholic family with 11 children. She studied at the Design Academy Eindhoven with Kees Bol and Jan Gregoor and at the Art Academy of Maastricht. Here she met her husband, sculptor Joep Coppens.

After her studies she made name as a painter, in particular of portraits. She ceased painting, however, due to having the Ehlers-Danlos syndrome. Since, she has been writing among others on her Christian belief.

Books written
 1996 - The other reality
 1997 - I stayed at the edge of the river
 2002 - Frank letters of belief 
 2008 - Martien Coppens, from village boy to city man (with Joep Coppens)

References

Further reading
 Leo Brabander: Ziekte en lijden voegen iets toe aan ons leven (Dutch: Disease and suffering add something to our lives), book chapter on Els Coppens van de Rijt in Geloven in Nederland. (Dutch: Believing in the Netherlands). Kampen: Kok, 2006, p. 38-43. 
 Joep en Els Coppens. Neerpelt: De Dommelhof, 1971.

1943 births
Living people
Dutch bloggers
Dutch non-fiction writers
Dutch Christians
Design Academy Eindhoven alumni
Christian writers
People from Sint-Oedenrode
Dutch people with disabilities
Dutch women painters
Dutch women bloggers
20th-century Dutch women artists
21st-century Dutch women artists